Broadway to Hollywood is an American television program broadcast on the now-defunct DuMont Television Network. While the daytime version was mainly a talk show with news, celebrity gossip, and home-viewer quizzes, the quiz portion became a full-fledged nighttime version within two weeks of the program's debut.

Broadcast history
The daytime show began on July 4, 1949, and was hosted by Don Russell. Two weeks later on July 20, a nighttime version hosted by George Putnam debuted. Both versions were originally called Headline Clues, with the nighttime show adopting a Broadway to Hollywood prefix on October 21, 1949. 

While Russell stayed with the daytime show until its end on May 4, 1951. Putnam left in February 1951 and was replaced by Bill Slater until 1953, after which Conrad Nagel took the reins until the show's end on July 15, 1954.

Actors who appeared on Broadway to Hollywood: Headline Clues included Conrad Nagel. Edgar Higgins was a writer for the program.

Tidewater Associated Oil Company sponsored the program, promoting its Tydol and Veedol products.

See also
 List of programs broadcast by the DuMont Television Network
 List of surviving DuMont Television Network broadcasts
 1949-50 United States network television schedule (Thursdays, 8:30pm ET)
 1950-51 United States network television schedule (Wednesdays, 10pm ET)
 1951-52 United States network television schedule (Thursdays, 8:30pm ET)
 1952-53 United States network television schedule (Thursdays, 8:30pm ET)
 1953-54 United States network television schedule (Thursdays, 8:30pm ET)

References

Bibliography
 David Weinstein, The Forgotten Network: DuMont and the Birth of American Television (Philadelphia: Temple University Press, 2004) 
 Alex McNeil, Total Television, Fourth edition (New York: Penguin Books, 1980) 
 Tim Brooks and Earle Marsh, The Complete Directory to Prime Time Network TV Shows, Third edition (New York: Ballantine Books, 1964)

External links
 
 DuMont historical website
DuMont Television Network original programming
1940s American game shows
1950s American game shows
1949 American television series debuts
1954 American television series endings
Black-and-white American television shows
Lost television shows